Central City is a village in Marion County, Illinois, United States. The population was 1,098 at the 2020 census.

Geography
It is bordered to the south by the city of Centralia. U.S. Route 51 passes through Central City as Broadway and Commercial Street, leading south into Centralia and north  to Sandoval.

Crooked Creek, a west-flowing tributary of the Kaskaskia River, touches the northern edge of the village.

Demographics

As of the census of 2000, there were 1,371 people, 550 households, and 371 families residing in the village. The racial makeup of the village was 94.97% White, 1.82% African American, 0.22% Native American, 0.22% Asian, 0.15% Pacific Islander, 0.58% from other races, and 2.04% from two or more races. Hispanic or Latino of any race were 2.48% of the population.

There were 550 households, out of which 34.5% had children under the age of 18 living with them, 46.9% were married couples living together, 16.0% had a female householder with no husband present, and 32.5% were non-families. 26.4% of all households were made up of individuals, and 12.2% had someone living alone who was 65 years of age or older. The average household size was 2.49 and the average family size was 3.02.

In the village, the population was spread out, with 28.5% under the age of 18, 9.7% from 18 to 24, 28.8% from 25 to 44, 19.0% from 45 to 64, and 13.9% who were 65 years of age or older. The median age was 34 years. For every 100 females, there were 94.2 males. For every 100 females age 18 and over, there were 88.1 males.

The median income for a household in the village was $31,136, and the median income for a family was $36,518. Males had a median income of $27,917 versus $22,500 for females. The per capita income for the village was $13,151. About 12.9% of families and 15.1% of the population were below the poverty line, including 19.3% of those under age 18 and 8.6% of those age 65 or over.

Notable people

 Jack Richardson, pitcher for the Philadelphia Athletics; born in Central City

References

External links

Villages in Marion County, Illinois
Villages in Illinois